On the Verge may refer to:

On the Verge (film), a 2008 independent documentary film
On the Verge (play), a 1987 play by Eric Overmyer also known as On the Verge (or The Geography of Yearning)
On the Verge (radio), an Irish radio show
On the Verge (TV series), a 2021 Netflix series created by Julie Delpy

Music
On the Verge, a 2013 blues album by The Fabulous Thunderbirds
"On the Verge" (song), by Collin Raye
"On the Verge", a song by Le Tigre from This Island

See also 

Verge (disambiguation)